Robbie Hourmont (born 21 April 1969 in Bristol) is a British former alpine skier who competed in the 1988 Winter Olympics.

Rob Hourmont is a former International World Cup and Olympic Ski Racer from the United Kingdom.  Rob was the youngest ever British Senior Slalom Champion in 1985 at the age of 15. In the next few years, Rob won several Junior and Senior British Ski Championships. He qualified to compete in the 1988 Winter Olympics at the age of 18, where he finished 21st in Slalom from a field of 120 competitors. Rob was ranked in the world’s top 30 in 1990 as his skiing career ended abruptly due to a training accident, causing severe knee damage.

Despite his injury, Rob continued to work on his athletic performance, rebuilding strength in his knee and leg to be able to ski and snowboard recreationally again. Rob’s many years as a professional athlete and recovery from injury has equipped him with in-depth knowledge of sports, fitness training, nutrition, movement, and recovery therapy.

In 2016, at the age of 46, Rob’s right knee finally gave in and had to be replaced with a full titanium prosthesis. At this time, Rob discovered the Keto Lifestyle, to which he adjusted his path immediately. He began to study the subject intensively and completed the Primal Health Coach Institute’s course in record time.

Rob began to experiment on his body to see what exercises would work best using his body as his gym. He began to experiment with food, started to source food locally and organically, and cook for himself instead of eating out.  The results were dramatic; within three months, Rob lost 40lbs of excess body weight, rebuilt lean muscle, and became an overall healthy person full of energy and positivity.

During 2018 and 2019, Rob traveled to Bali, Indonesia, where he continued to experiment with food, exercise, and movement routine.  Rob carefully developed his unique approach and methodology to Fitness, Keto-Food, and Lifestyle, under the branded “A Primal Lifestyle” Program. Using his methods, Rob has personally coached over 100 clients to lose excess body fat, gain lean muscle and a more positive outlook on life.

Rounding off his knowledge, Rob studied Meditation and Muay Thai Boxing in Bali. Meditation to learn to calm, focus, and balance the mind. Muay Thai Boxing to learn the technique and discipline of this ancient sport, which aligns closely with our ancestors’ “playtime” fighting games.

Rob is a certified Trainer in Meditation and Muay Thai Boxing in Indonesia.

Rob started the “A Primal Lifestyle” Blog in 2018, which has consistently gained followers and interest ever since. The Primal Lifestyle Program’s primary focus is on Personal Health Coaching, which is why Rob decided to launch the new Blog “Rob’s Health Crunch.”

“Our goal at Rob’s Health Crunch is to deliver daily news, scientifically-backed articles, and tips on health, fitness, keto, optimal lifestyle practices and travel life on keto, crunching out the truth and helping as many people as possible worldwide regain their ideal health and fitness.” Rob Hourmont.

References

www.robshealthcrunch.com

http://www.baliconnection.press

1969 births
Living people
Sportspeople from Bristol
English male alpine skiers
Olympic alpine skiers of Great Britain
Alpine skiers at the 1988 Winter Olympics